Major John George Neilson Clift  (23 June 1877 – 14 May 1953) was a British sports shooter and archaeologist. He competed in the 50 m rifle event at the 1924 Summer Olympics.

From 1907 to 1914, he was joint honorary secretary of the British Archaeological Association. He also served in the Royal Engineers and the Royal Air Force in the First World War. He was appointed a Member of the Order of the British Empire in the 1919 New Year Honours. He was later awarded the OBE. He died in Cheltenham.

References

External links
 

1877 births
1953 deaths
British male sport shooters
Olympic shooters of Great Britain
Shooters at the 1924 Summer Olympics
People from Wandsworth
Sportspeople from London
Officers of the Order of the British Empire
British archaeologists